Miss Earth Bangladesh  is a national beauty contest that selects Bangladesh's representative in the Miss Earth contest.

Top four titleholder is named as Miss Earth Bangladesh, Miss Air Bangladesh, Miss Fire Bangladesh, Miss Water Bangladesh.  The next six title holders are the name of Bangladeshi six seasons. Miss Summer, Miss Rainy, Miss Autumn, Miss Late Autumn, Miss Winter & Miss Spring.

History 
Miss Earth Bangladesh launched officially on 28 January 2020. Meghna Alam became the first winner of this competition in 2020.

Titleholders

See also 
 Miss Bangladesh
 Miss Universe Bangladesh
 Miss World Bangladesh

References

Beauty pageants in Bangladesh